George Flynn is a distinguished American composer and pianist. Born in Montana on January 21, 1937, he grew up in Montana and Washington. He received his B.A. and Ph.D. from, and taught at Columbia University, New York City, and from 1977 to 2001 headed the Department of Composition at DePaul University in Chicago. His works cover a wide range of genres, from symphonies to electronic compositions. His 114-minute piano cycle Trinity was described in Tempo in 2005 as a ‘masterpiece’. It consists of three very large piano pieces, Kanal, Wound and Salvage, each performable on its own. The work has been recorded by the pianist Fredrik Ullén.

Selected compositions
Orchestral
 Mrs. Brown for chamber orchestra and tape (1965)
 First Symphony "Music For Orchestra" (1966)
 Tirades and Dreams for chamber orchestra, narrator and soprano (1972)
 Second Symphony (1981)
 Meditations, Praises for chamber orchestra (1981)
 Focus for chamber orchestra (1983)
 Coloration for chamber orchestra (1983)
 Quietude for small orchestra (1983)
 Lost and Found for youth orchestra (1984)
 A Reign of Love for narrator and orchestra (1992)
 Surfaces for chamber orchestra (1997)
 Winter Dusk for string orchestra (1999)
 Rita's Dance (2000)

Concertante
 The Density of Memory for clarinet trio and orchestra (1997)
 American City for piano and wind ensemble (1998)

Chamber music
 Piano Quartet (1963)
 Solos and Duos for violin and piano (1964)
 Four Pieces for violin and piano (1965)
 Duo for clarinet and piano (1966)
 Duo for trumpet and piano (1974)
 American Festivals and Dreams for string quartet (1976)
 Duo for cello and piano (1977)
 Duo for violin and piano (1979)
 Celebration for violin and piano (1980)
 Fantasy Etudes for violin solo (1981)
 Saxophone Quartet (1982)
 Woodwind Quintet (1983)
 American Rest for clarinet, viola, cello and piano (1982, 1984)
 Diversion for flute, clarinet, violin, cello and piano (1984)
 American Summer for violin, cello and piano (1986)
 Turmoil and Lullabies for clarinet, viola, cello and piano (1986)
 Disquietude and Lullaby for clarinet, viola, cello and piano (1986)
 Diversions for Five Woodwinds (1988)
 Til Death for violin and piano (1988)
 Who Shall Inherit the Earth? for clarinet, viola and 2 pianos (1989)
 Forms of Flight for clarinet solo (1991)
 The Streets are Empty for saxophone quartet (1992)
 Duo for viola and piano (1974, 1985, 1995)
 Winter Landscape Duo for cello and piano (1998)
 Together for violin and piano (2003)
 American Enchantment for string quartet (2003)
 Seeking Serenity for violin and piano (2005)

Harpsichord
 Drive (1973)

Piano
 Fuguing (1962)
 Fantasy (1966)
 Music for Piano Four Hands (1966)
 Wound (1968)
 Kanal (1976)
 American Icon (1988)
 Pieces of Night (American Nocturnes) (1989)
 Toward the Light (1991)
 Salvage (1993)
 Preludes (1994)
 Derus Simples (1995)
 Glimpses of Our Inner Lives (2001)
 Remembering (2003)

Vocal
 Benedictus for mixed voices (1962)
 Christmas Fanfare for mixed chorus (1972)
 Lady of Silences for female chorus (1973)
 Ave Maria for mixed voices unaccompanied, or with piano (1973
 Ave Maria for female chorus (1973)
 Songs of Destruction for soprano and piano (1974)
 Dies Sanctificatus for soprano, alto and piano (1976)
 Dawn for mixed chorus (1977)
 Dusk for mixed chorus (1977)
 Kyrie for female chorus (1977)
 Agnus Dei for female chorus (1977)
 American Voices for mixed chorus, horn and piano (1983)

References

 Classical Connect biography
 "Classical Connect completes the George Flynn project"
 Chicago Sound review of American City
 Jazz Review review of American City

External links
 Official web site
 Interview with George Flynn, November 23, 1996

1937 births
Living people
American male composers
20th-century American composers
American classical pianists
Male classical pianists
American male pianists
Columbia University faculty
DePaul University faculty
20th-century American pianists
21st-century classical pianists
20th-century American male musicians
21st-century American male musicians
21st-century American pianists
Columbia University School of General Studies alumni
Columbia Graduate School of Arts and Sciences alumni